
Gmina Lutomiersk is a rural gmina (administrative district) in Pabianice County, Łódź Voivodeship, in central Poland.

Villages
Gmina Lutomiersk contains the villages and settlements of:

Neighbouring gminas
Gmina Lutomiersk is bordered by the town of Konstantynów Łódzki and by the gminas of Aleksandrów Łódzki, Dalików, Łask, Pabianice, Poddębice, Wodzierady and Zadzim.

References

Lutomiersk
Pabianice County